Shafaatullah Khan is a tabla, sitar and surbahar player. He is the fourth son of Imrat Khan.

References

External links
 Shafaatullah Khan's website

Etawah gharana
Hindustani instrumentalists
People convicted of indecent assault
Year of birth missing (living people)
Living people
Sitar players
Tabla players